The Anglican Church of St Mary Magdalene in Withiel Florey, Somerset, England was built in the 12th century. It is a Grade II* listed building.

History

Parts of the church date back to the 12th century. In 1110 it was the property of Taunton Priory. In the 15th century the nave was extended and the tower and porch added. In 1848 a Victorian restoration was carried out and the vestry added.

In 1959 proposals were made to demolish the church. These were defeated and further restoration undertaken.

The parish is part of the  Dulverton with Brushford, Brompton Regis, Upton, Skilgate and Withiel Florey benefice within the Diocese of Bath and Wells.

Architecture

The stone building has red sandstone dressings and a slate roof. It consists of a two-bay nave, two-bay chancel with two-storey vestry and a south porch.

The two-stage tower is supported by diagonal buttresses.

Inside the church is a Norman font. Most of the other fitting including the pulpit, harmonium and wrought iron altar rails are from the Victorian era.

References

Grade II* listed buildings in West Somerset
Grade II* listed churches in Somerset